Then and Now may refer to:

Music
 Then & Now (Asia album), 1990
 Then and Now (David Cassidy album), 2001
 Then & Now (Shirley Jones album), 2008
 Then and Now (Doc Watson album), 1973
 Then and Now (Emerson, Lake & Palmer album), 1998
 Then and Now (Grover Washington Jr. album), 1988
 Then & Now (The Jets album), 1998
 Then and Now (Nik Kershaw album), 2005
 Then and Now (Lynyrd Skynyrd album), 2000
 Then and Now (Overkill album), 2002
 Then and Now (Warrant album), 2004
 Then and Now (The Who album), 2004 
 Then & Now... The Best of The Monkees, 1986
 Then & Now: The Hits Collection, an album by Tracy Lawrence
 Then & Now: The Very Best of Petula Clark, 2008
 Then and Now (Dokken album), an album by Dokken
 Then and Now (Livin Out Loud album), 2004
 Live Then & Now 1999, a concert tour by Mike Oldfield
 Then and Now, an HBO special featuring the band the Association
 "Then and Now" (song), a 1954 song by Paul Whiteman
Then & Now, 2019 album by South Korean pop group g.o.d

Other
 Then and Now (books), a book series originally from BT Batsord in the UK, then from Thunder Bay Press in the USA and Pavilion Books in the UK
  Then and Now (novel), a 1946 novel by W. Somerset Maugham
 Then and Now (retailer), a London-based internet retailer of fashion, accessories and homewear

See also
 Now and Then (disambiguation)
 Every Now and Then (disambiguation)
 Then (disambiguation)
 Now (disambiguation)
 Past and Present (disambiguation)
 Yesterday and Today (disambiguation)